Spiegel is German, Yiddish, and Dutch for "mirror". More specifically, it may refer to:

Publications
 Der Spiegel, a weekly German magazine
 Der Spiegel (online), the online sibling of Der Spiegel

Political
 Spiegel scandal, a 1962 German political scandal, named after Der Spiegel magazine

People
 Spiegel (surname), a German surname
 Spiegel Grove, the Fremont, Ohio, home of U.S. President Rutherford B. Hayes, named after mirror-like pools of rainwater
 Adriaan van den Spiegel, a Flemish anatomist.

Fictional characters
 Spike Spiegel, the main character of the anime Cowboy Bebop

Businesses
 Spiegel (catalog), an American catalog retailer
 Spiegel, Inc., the former name of the Eddie Bauer Holdings

Ships
 USS Spiegel Grove (LSD-32), a dock landing ship of the United States Navy
 Spiegel, the flagship of Michiel de Ruyter during the Second Anglo-Dutch War

Songs
 "Spiegel" (song), a hip hop song by German girl group Tic Tac Toe

Literature
 "Spiegel the Cat", a story-poem by David Martin based on a tale by Gottfried Keller

Locations
 Spiegel bei Koeniz, a village in the Swiss canton of Bern

Industry
 Spiegeleisen, a pig iron containing a high level of manganese used in the manufacture of steel

Medical
 Spigelian hernia, a hernia of the abdominal wall, named after Van den Spiegel

See also 
 Spiegel im Spiegel, a piece of music written by Arvo Pärt in 1978
 Spiegeltent
 Spiegle
 Spiegl